Club Deportivo Eldense is a Spanish football team based in Elda, in the autonomous community of Valencia. Founded in 1921, the club plays in the Primera División RFEF – Group 2, and holds home matches at Estadio Nuevo Pepico Amat, which has a capacity of 4,036 spectators.

History
One of the oldest clubs in the Valencian Community, Eldense enrolled in the Valencian Football Federation in 1924, and started competing in Tercera División 19 years later. It first appeared in Segunda División in the 1956–57 season, narrowly avoiding relegation after finishing in 16th position; the first spell in that tier lasted three years, in a total of five at the professional level.

Match fixing allegations
On 4 April 2017, Eldense coach Filippo Vito di Pierro and general manager Nobile Capuani were arrested by Spanish authorities on charges of corruption. The detentions occurred after club president David Aguilar made complaints of match fixing following a 0–12 loss to FC Barcelona B, whilst Eldense player Cheikh Saad said that he had seen Aguilar arguing with di Pierro at half-time of the match, calling the latter a "scoundrel"; subsequently, the former asked La Liga president Javier Tebas to investigate those allegations.

Eldense temporarily suspended all sporting activities, also ending its contract with the Italian investment group represented by Capuani. They also released 12 players, with five people being arrested in connection with the events.

Season to season

5 seasons in Segunda División
1 season in Primera División RFEF
11 seasons in Segunda División B
1 season in Segunda División RFEF
59 seasons in Tercera División

Honours
Tercera División: 1955–56, 1961–62, 1965–66, 1966–67, 1978–79, 1982–83, 1983–84, 1984–85, 1985–86, 1991–92, 1997–98, 2013–14

Current squad
.

Youth players

Out on loan

Famous players

References

External links
Official website 
Futbolme team profile 
Club & stadium history 

 
Football clubs in the Valencian Community
Association football clubs established in 1921
1921 establishments in Spain
Segunda División clubs
Primera Federación clubs